The 1996 Miami Hurricanes baseball team represented the University of Miami in the 1996 NCAA Division I baseball season. The Hurricanes played their home games at the original Mark Light Field. The team was coached by Jim Morris in his 3rd season at Miami.

The Hurricanes lost the College World Series, defeated by the LSU Tigers in the championship game.

Roster

Schedule and results

! style="" | Regular Season (43–12)
|- valign="top"

|- align="center" bgcolor="#ccffcc"
| ||  || Mark Light Field • Coral Gables, Florida || 25–0 || 1–0
|-

|- align="center" bgcolor="#ffcccc"
| || Florida || Mark Light Field • Coral Gables, Florida || 4–7 || 1–1
|- align="center" bgcolor="#ccffcc"
| || Florida || Mark Light Field • Coral Gables, Florida || 5–1 || 2–1
|- align="center" bgcolor="#ccffcc"
| ||  || Mark Light Field • Coral Gables, Florida || 8–3 || 3–1
|- align="center" bgcolor="#ccffcc"
| || Coastal Carolina || Mark Light Field • Coral Gables, Florida || 7–2 || 4–1
|- align="center" bgcolor="#ccffcc"
| || Coastal Carolina || Mark Light Field • Coral Gables, Florida || 16–11 || 5–1
|- align="center" bgcolor="#ccffcc"
| ||  || Mark Light Field • Coral Gables, Florida || 6–0 || 6–1
|- align="center" bgcolor="#ccffcc"
| || George Washington || Mark Light Field • Coral Gables, Florida || 14–1 || 7–1
|- align="center" bgcolor="#ccffcc"
| || George Washington || Mark Light Field • Coral Gables, Florida || 19–3 || 8–1
|- align="center" bgcolor="#ccffcc"
| ||  || Mark Light Field • Coral Gables, Florida || 12–3 || 9–1
|- align="center" bgcolor="#ffcccc"
| || at Florida || Alfred A. McKethan Stadium • Gainesville, Florida || 7–8 || 9–2
|- align="center" bgcolor="#ffcccc"
| || at Florida || Alfred A. McKethan Stadium • Gainesville, Florida || 1–5 || 9–3
|-

|- align="center" bgcolor="#ccffcc"
| ||  || Mark Light Field • Coral Gables, Florida || 14–10 || 10–3
|- align="center" bgcolor="#ccffcc"
| || Illinois || Mark Light Field • Coral Gables, Florida || 10–0 || 11–3
|- align="center" bgcolor="#ccffcc"
| || Illinois || Mark Light Field • Coral Gables, Florida || 6–4 || 12–3
|- align="center" bgcolor="#ccffcc"
| ||  || Mark Light Field • Coral Gables, Florida || 10–3 || 13–3
|- align="center" bgcolor="#ffcccc"
| ||  || Mark Light Field • Coral Gables, Florida || 4–5 || 13–4
|- align="center" bgcolor="#ccffcc"
| || Rutgers || Mark Light Field • Coral Gables, Florida || 12–3 || 14–4
|- align="center" bgcolor="#ccffcc"
| ||  || Mark Light Field • Coral Gables, Florida || 17–4 || 15–4
|- align="center" bgcolor="#ccffcc"
| || Maine || Mark Light Field • Coral Gables, Florida || 10–3 || 16–4
|- align="center" bgcolor="#ccffcc"
| || Maine || Mark Light Field • Coral Gables, Florida || 15–3 || 17–4
|- align="center" bgcolor="#ccffcc"
| ||  || Mark Light Field • Coral Gables, Florida || 13–6 || 18–4
|- align="center" bgcolor="#ccffcc"
| || FIU || Mark Light Field • Coral Gables, Florida || 5–3 || 19–4
|- align="center" bgcolor="#ccffcc"
| || FIU || Mark Light Field • Coral Gables, Florida || 5–4 || 20–4
|- align="center" bgcolor="#ffcccc"
| || FIU || Mark Light Field • Coral Gables, Florida || 5–6 || 20–5
|- align="center" bgcolor="#ccffcc"
| ||  || Mark Light Field • Coral Gables, Florida || 8–0 || 21–5
|- align="center" bgcolor="#ccffcc"
| ||  || Mark Light Field • Coral Gables, Florida || 10–3 || 22–5
|- align="center" bgcolor="#ccffcc"
| || Bethune–Cookman || Mark Light Field • Coral Gables, Florida || 20–3 || 23–5
|-

|- align="center" bgcolor="#ccffcc"
| ||  || Mark Light Field • Coral Gables, Florida || 13–2 || 24–5
|- align="center" bgcolor="#ffcccc"
| || at Florida State || Dick Howser Stadium • Tallahassee, Florida || 2–13 || 24–6
|- align="center" bgcolor="#ccffcc"
| || at Florida State || Dick Howser Stadium • Tallahassee, Florida || 2–1 || 25–6
|- align="center" bgcolor="#ffcccc"
| || at Florida State || Dick Howser Stadium • Tallahassee, Florida || 1–15 || 25–7
|- align="center" bgcolor="#ccffcc"
| || St. Thomas (FL) || Mark Light Field • Coral Gables, Florida || 15–2 || 26–7
|- align="center" bgcolor="#ccffcc"
| || Florida State || Mark Light Field • Coral Gables, Florida || 6–2 || 27–7
|- align="center" bgcolor="#ccffcc"
| || Florida State || Mark Light Field • Coral Gables, Florida || 9–8 || 28–7
|- align="center" bgcolor="#ccffcc"
| || Florida State || Mark Light Field • Coral Gables, Florida || 7–4 || 29–7
|- align="center" bgcolor="#ffcccc"
| || at  || Lindsey Nelson Stadium • Knoxville, Tennessee || 1–12 || 29–8
|- align="center" bgcolor="#ffcccc"
| || at Tennessee || Lindsey Nelson Stadium • Knoxville, Tennessee || 2–4 || 29–9
|- align="center" bgcolor="#ffcccc"
| || at Tennessee || Lindsey Nelson Stadium • Knoxville, Tennessee || 2–3 || 29–10
|- align="center" bgcolor="#ccffcc"
| ||  || Mark Light Field • Coral Gables, Florida || 5–3 || 30–10
|- align="center" bgcolor="#ccffcc"
| || Tampa || Mark Light Field • Coral Gables, Florida || 2–1 || 31–10
|- align="center" bgcolor="#ccffcc"
| ||  || Mark Light Field • Coral Gables, Florida || 20–7 || 32–10
|- align="center" bgcolor="#ccffcc"
| || Stetson || Mark Light Field • Coral Gables, Florida || 7–6 || 33–10
|- align="center" bgcolor="#ccffcc"
| || Stetson || Mark Light Field • Coral Gables, Florida || 9–4 || 34–10
|-

|- align="center" bgcolor="#ccffcc"
| ||  || Mark Light Field • Coral Gables, Florida || 12–4 || 35–10
|- align="center" bgcolor="#ccffcc"
| ||  || Mark Light Field • Coral Gables, Florida || 3–2 || 36–10
|- align="center" bgcolor="#ccffcc"
| || South Florida || Mark Light Field • Coral Gables, Florida || 9–5 || 37–10
|- align="center" bgcolor="#ffcccc"
| || South Florida || Mark Light Field • Coral Gables, Florida || 4–10 || 37–11
|- align="center" bgcolor="#ccffcc"
| || Florida Atlantic || Mark Light Field • Coral Gables, Florida || 10–2 || 38–11
|- align="center" bgcolor="#ccffcc"
| || at  || John Sessions Stadium • Jacksonville, Florida || 9–1 || 39–11
|- align="center" bgcolor="#ccffcc"
| || at Jacksonville || John Sessions Stadium • Jacksonville, Florida || 15–5 || 40–11
|- align="center" bgcolor="#ccffcc"
| || at Jacksonville || John Sessions Stadium • Jacksonville, Florida || 16–2 || 41–11
|- align="center" bgcolor="#ccffcc"
| ||  || Mark Light Field • Coral Gables, Florida || 5–4 || 42–11
|- align="center" bgcolor="#ccffcc"
| || Cal State Fullerton || Mark Light Field • Coral Gables, Florida || 8–7 || 43–11
|- align="center" bgcolor="#ffcccc"
| || Cal State Fullerton || Mark Light Field • Coral Gables, Florida || 6–7 || 43–12
|-

|-
! style="" | Postseason (7–2)
|-

|- align="center" bgcolor="#ffcccc"
| || vs  || UFCU Disch–Falk Field • Austin, Texas || 4–5 || 43–13
|- align="center" bgcolor="#ccffcc"
| || vs  || UFCU Disch–Falk Field • Austin, Texas || 5–2 || 44–13
|- align="center" bgcolor="#ccffcc"
| || at  || UFCU Disch–Falk Field • Austin, Texas || 9–7 || 45–13
|- align="center" bgcolor="#ccffcc"
| || vs  || UFCU Disch–Falk Field • Austin, Texas || 8–2 || 46–13
|- align="center" bgcolor="#ccffcc"
| || vs  || UFCU Disch–Falk Field • Austin, Texas || 8–4 || 47–13
|-

|- align="center" bgcolor="#ccffcc"
| || vs Clemson || Johnny Rosenblatt Stadium • Omaha, Nebraska || 7–3 || 48–13
|- align="center" bgcolor="#ccffcc"
| || vs Alabama || Johnny Rosenblatt Stadium • Omaha, Nebraska || 15–1 || 49–13
|- align="center" bgcolor="#ccffcc"
| || vs Clemson || Johnny Rosenblatt Stadium • Omaha, Nebraska || 14–5 || 50–13
|- align="center" bgcolor="#ffcccc"
| || vs LSU || Johnny Rosenblatt Stadium • Omaha, Nebraska || 8–9 || 50–14
|- align="center" bgcolor="white"

| Schedule Source:

Awards and honors 
Rudy Gomez
All Tournament Team

Pat Burrell
College World Series Most Outstanding Player
All Tournament Team
American Baseball Coaches Association All-American
Baseball America Freshman of the Year

Alex Cora
All Tournament Team

Michael DeCelle
All Tournament Team

J. D. Arteaga
All Tournament Team

Robbie Morrison
Collegiate Baseball All-American

Hurricanes in the 1996 MLB Draft
The following members of the Miami Hurricanes baseball program were drafted in the 1996 Major League Baseball Draft.

References

Miami (FL)
Miami Hurricanes baseball seasons
Miami Hurricaness baseball
College World Series seasons
Miami